This is the List of municipalities in Mersin Province, Turkey .

Municipalities and mayors 

(Color legend for the statue of the settlement. Each status group is sorted alphabetically within the group)

Changes in 2014
According to Law act no. 6360, belde (town) municipalities within provinces with more than 750,000 population (so called Metropolitan municipalities) were abolished as of 30 March 2014. 41 belde municipalities in the above list are now defunct. The list is kept for historical reference.

See also
List of populated places in Mersin Province

References 

Geography of Mersin Province
Mersin